My Ninety Nine Brides (German: Meine 99 Bräute) is a 1958 West German romantic comedy film directed by Alfred Vohrer and starring Claus Wilcke, Horst Frank and Wera Frydtberg.

It was shot at the Tempelhof Studios in Berlin. The film's sets were designed by the art director Karl Weber.

Synopsis
In Munich a womaniser who has had dalliances with ninety nine different girls eventually meets the hundredth and falls genuinely in love with her.

Cast

References

Bibliography 
 Bock, Hans-Michael & Bergfelder, Tim. The Concise CineGraph. Encyclopedia of German Cinema. Berghahn Books, 2009.

External links 
 

1958 films
1958 romantic comedy films
German romantic comedy films
West German films
1950s German-language films
Films directed by Alfred Vohrer
Films shot at Tempelhof Studios
Films set in Munich
1950s German films